Kurt Nordbø (1 August 1931 – 17 October 2009) was a Norwegian politician for the Socialist Electoral League.

He served as a deputy representative to the Parliament of Norway from Rogaland during the term 1973–1977. In total he met during 14 days of parliamentary session.

References

1931 births
2009 deaths
Deputy members of the Storting
Socialist Left Party (Norway) politicians
Rogaland politicians